Eliyahu "Eli" Zizov (born 30 January 1991) is an Israeli footballer.

Early life
Zizov was born in Beer Sheva, Israel, to a Jewish family.  He is of paternal Georgian-Jewish descent.

Career
When he was six years old, he joined the Maccabi Tel Aviv academy. Zizov had briefly trained with FC Barcelona and was a target of Chelsea F.C., but eventually he joined Levski Sofia, with whom he has already played an official match in the A PFG: against PFC Rodopa Smolyan in April 2007 when he was 16 years, 2 month and 15 days old and thus he became the youngest foreign player making an appearance in the Bulgarian Championship.

Zizov decided to return to Israel, because he refused to sign a contract with PFC Levski Sofia, due to disagreements regarding his salary and playing opportunities.

In January 2010, he made his debut for the Portuguese side Sporting Clube de Braga senior team in a Taça da Liga game against U.D. Leiria.

On 3 July 2011, he signed with the Israeli side Maccabi Tel Aviv.

On 16 November 2013, Zizov signed with Hapoel Acre on a 3 year contract. Acre paid Maccabi 50,000 Shekels for the Israeli.

Playing style
Zizov can play as a winger, striker or second striker.

Honours
A PFG (1):
2008–09

References

External links

 Profile at LevskiSofia.info

1991 births
Israeli Jews
Living people
Israeli footballers
PFC Levski Sofia players
Maccabi Tel Aviv F.C. players
Hapoel Acre F.C. players
Maccabi Kiryat Gat F.C. players
Nordia Jerusalem F.C. players
Hapoel Bik'at HaYarden F.C. players
Israeli expatriate footballers
Expatriate footballers in Bulgaria
Israeli expatriate sportspeople in Bulgaria
First Professional Football League (Bulgaria) players
Israeli Premier League players
Liga Leumit players
Footballers from Beersheba
Israeli people of Georgian-Jewish descent
Association football forwards